Jonathan Judaken is the Spence L. Wilson Chair in Humanities at Rhodes College. Judaken previously taught at the University of Memphis where he was the Dunavant Professor of History and Director of the Marcus Orr Center for the Humanities. His fields of expertise include European cultural and intellectual history, discussions of Jews and Judaism, race and racism, and post-Holocaust French philosophy. Judaken is a notable scholar of Jean-Paul Sartre and Sartre's relationship to Jews and Judaism and race and racism, as well as contemporary French Jewish philosophers.

Scholarship 
Judaken is the author of Jean-Paul Sartre and the Jewish Question: Anti-antisemitism and the Politics of the French Intellectual, in which he argues that  "representations of Jews and Judaism as persistent figures of alterity serve as a fecund site to interrogate and reevaluate [Sartre's] oeuvre, especially his conception of the role of the intellectual." He is the editor of three volumes compiling scholarly contributions to the study of race and racism, existentialism, and the intersection between them: Race After Sartre: Antiracism, Africana Existentialism, Postcolonialism, Naming Race, Naming Racisms, and most recently Situating Existentialism: Key Texts in Context, which provides a history of the systemization and canonization of existentialism as a philosophical movement. 
In addition, Judaken is U.S. consulting editor for the journal Patterns of Prejudice and has been a scholar in residence at the United States Holocaust Memorial Museum. He has held memberships in the Association for Jewish Studies, American Historical Association, American Academy of Religion, and the International Society for the Study of European Ideas. Judaken is a founding member of the International Consortium for Research on Antisemitism and Racism (ICRAR), an organization of European, American, and Israeli scholars aimed at "revitalising and reshaping the study of antisemitism."  In his scholarship on anti-Semitism, Judaken is critical of the concept of a "New anti-Semitism", arguing "there is not much empirical evidence to support the idea that a new alliance between Leftists and jihadists cemented together by anti-Zionism is emerging." Judaken has expressed support for the term "new Judeophobia", coined by Pierre-André Taguieff, as a better means of characterizing the recent upsurge of violence and hatred against Jews.

Biography   
Judaken was born in Johannesburg, South Africa on February 23, 1968. Judaken's youthful experience as a Jew living under South African apartheid, as a member of both a religious minority and the dominant racial group, helped to drive his career interest in subjects such as existentialism, racism and the so-called Jewish Question.    After immigrating to the United States as a teenager, Judaken received a B.A. in philosophy from the University of California, San Diego and an M.A. and Ph.D in history from the University of California, Irvine. After completing a post-doctoral fellowship at the Hebrew University of Jerusalem, Judaken joined the history faculty at the University of Memphis in 1999. He left the University of Memphis for Rhodes College in 2011, where he was appointed the first Spence L. Wilson Chair in Humanities. In his capacity as Spence L. Wilson Chair, Judaken directs the Communities in Conversation program, which facilitates interdisciplinary lectures and events for Rhodes students, faculty and the general public in Memphis.
In 2019, Judaken was selected as a committee member for Rhodes College's new Jewish, Islamic, and Middle East Studies Program, which houses three different minors in (1) Jewish Studies; (2) Islamic and Middle East Studies: and (3) Jewish, Islamic and Middle East Studies. Judaken hosts the educational interview program Counterpoint on WKNO-FM, the NPR affiliate station for the Mid-South.

References

21st-century American historians
Sartre scholars
Rhodes College faculty
University of Memphis faculty
Historians of Jews and Judaism
Writers from Johannesburg
University of California, San Diego alumni
University of California, Irvine alumni
Hebrew University of Jerusalem alumni
Historians of philosophy
Humanities academics
Living people
1968 births
South African Jews